In Aboriginal mythology (specifically: Arrernte), the Inapertwa are the simple, ancestral creatures with which the Numakulla modelled all life (plant, animals, birds) on Earth, which they then formed into human beings. The "totems" of the Arrernte are named after individual Inapertwa formed into animals, then into humans.

References 

 Leach, Maria, ed. (1984). Funk & Wagnalls Standard Dictionary of Folklore, Mythology, and Legend. New York: HarperCollins.
 Roberts, Ainslie and Charles P. Mountford. (1973). The Dreamtime Book: Australian Aboriginal Myths. Englewood Cliffs, NJ: Prentice-Hall, p. 48.\Spencer, Sir Baldwin. (1904). Northern Tribes of Central Australia. London: Macmillan, p. 749.

Australian Aboriginal mythology
Arrernte